Sherville Alister Huggins (born 22 May 1972) is a former West Indian cricketer. Huggins was a right-handed batsman who bowled right-arm slow-medium. He was born at Basseterre, Saint Kitts and Nevis.

In February 2006, Huggins played for the United States Virgin Islands in the 2006 Stanford 20/20, whose matches held official Twenty20 status. He made two appearances in the tournament, in a preliminary round victory against Sint Maarten and in a first-round defeat against St Vincent and the Grenadines. He later played for the United States Virgin Islands in their second appearance in the Stanford 20/20 in 2008, making two appearances in a preliminary round victory against St Kitts and in a first-round defeat against Antigua and Barbuda. He captained the team in its four Twenty20 matches, scoring a total of 146 runs at an average of 48.66 and a high score of 51 against St Maarten. He was the team's leading run-scorer in its four Twenty20 appearances, as well as the only United States Virgin Islands player to pass fifty runs in an innings. He also took 3 wickets with the ball, at a bowling average of 20.33 and best figures of 2/17.

References

External links
Sherville Huggins at ESPNcricinfo
Sherville Huggins at CricketArchive

1972 births
Living people
People from Basseterre
United States Virgin Islands cricketers
Saint Kitts and Nevis emigrants to the United States Virgin Islands
Kittitian cricketers